Miroslav Radman (born April 30, 1944) is a Croatian biologist.

Biography

Radman was born in Split, PR Croatia, Yugoslavia. From 1962–1967 he studied experimental biology, physical chemistry and molecular biology at the University of Zagreb and in 1969 he obtained a doctorate degree in molecular biology at the Free University of Brussels.  He spent the next three years at Harvard University as a postdoctoral researcher. From 1973 until 1983 he was Professor of Molecular Biology at the Free University of Brussels and from 1983 until 1998 the Research Director at the French Centre for Scientific Research at the University of Paris 7. He is now a professor of cellular biology at the Faculté de Médecine – Necker, Université Paris V, Paris, France. In  2002 he became a full member of the French Academy of Sciences, the first Croat to do so in the Academy's history. Radman is a co-founder of the Mediterranean Institute For Life Sciences located in Split, Croatia.

Scientific work

Radman's specialty is DNA repair. His work with Evelyn M. Witkin set the basis for the discovery of the SOS response. The SOS response hypothesis was put forward by Radman in 1970 in a letter sent to various researchers, and later published in 1974.

With his group he demonstrated the molecular mechanism of speciation by showing that DNA mismatch repair mechanism prevents recombination between similar chromosomes which leads to establishment of genetic barriers between species.

In 2011 Radman won the FEMS-Lwoff Award, given out by the Federation of European Microbiological Societies, for his research of DNA repair mechanism in Deinococcus radiodurans. He clarified the molecular mechanism that allows Deinococcus radiodurans to repair its fatally damaged DNA.

Radman developed a methodology which enables direct visualization of horizontal gene transfer.

Awards and memberships
 Antoine Lacassagne Award (1979), Grand Prix of the French League Against Cancer for the discovery of the mutagenic SOS system in bacteria
 Golden Eureka of Innovation (1990)
 Grand Prix Charles-Leopold Mayer of the French Academy of Science for the co-discovery of DNA error correction (mismatch repair)
 Medal of Honour (1992) awarded by Society for the Encouragement of Progress
 Spiridion Brusina Medal (1998) at the 100th anniversary of the Croatian Naturalists' Society
 Leopold Griffuel Prize for the contributions to the field of DNA repair
 Richard Lounsbery Award – Joint Award of the French and U.S. national academies of science for the discovery of DNA mismatch repair as genetic barrier between related species
 Science Award (2000) from the “U.S. Environmental Mutagen Society” for "far-reaching research contributions to understanding the profound consequences of mutation and recombination, in global genomic responses, DNA repair, cancer and evolution"
 Katzir Katchalsky Honorary Lecturer (2000), Weizmann Institute, Israel
 Grand Prix de l'INSERM (2003) awarded by the French Institute of Health and Medical Research
 Leonardo Award (2004) for creativity in scientific research
 FEMS-Lwoff Award (2011) for his research of DNA repair mechanism in Deinococcus radiodurans
 Fellow of French Academy of Sciences
 Corresponding member of Croatian Academy of Arts and Sciences
 Foreign honorary member of American Academy of Arts and Sciences 
 Member of The Academy of Europe(2018)

References

External links
 https://web.archive.org/web/20060831161219/http://www.necker.fr/tamara/pages/miro.html
 https://web.archive.org/web/20060920081459/http://www.academie-sciences.fr/membres/R/Radman_Miroslav_bio.htm
 Miroslav Radman, Grand Prix Inserm 2003 de la recherche médicale
 Mediterranean Institute For Life Sciences

1944 births
Living people
Croatian biologists
French biologists
Members of the French Academy of Sciences
Foreign associates of the National Academy of Sciences
Richard-Lounsbery Award laureates
Members of Academia Europaea
Faculty of Science, University of Zagreb alumni
Scientists from Split, Croatia
Academic staff of the University of Paris
French people of Croatian descent